Jin Xuefei (born 25 June 1964) is a Chinese alpine skier. She competed in two events at the 1984 Winter Olympics.

References

1964 births
Living people
Chinese female alpine skiers
Olympic alpine skiers of China
Alpine skiers at the 1984 Winter Olympics
Skiers from Jilin
Asian Games medalists in alpine skiing
Asian Games bronze medalists for China
Alpine skiers at the 1986 Asian Winter Games
Medalists at the 1986 Asian Winter Games
20th-century Chinese women